Carex amplectens, the claspbract sedge, is a species of sedge that was first described by Kenneth Mackenzie in 1917.

References

amplectens
Plants described in 1917